Abdul Gafur Hali (also known as Gafur Hali Maizbhanderi; 6 August 1929 – 21 December 2016) was a Bangladeshi folk lyricist, composer and singer of the Maizbhandari musical tradition. He was the first folk play author to use the Chittagonian language. His works are created mainly in his native language of Chittagong. He was also known by his Sufi name, Gafur Hali Maizbhanderi.

Early life and education
Hali was born to Abdus Sobhan and Gultaj Khatun, in Rashidabad; in the Patiya region within the Chittagong district in 1929. He married Rajia Begum.

Hali studied primary school at Rashidabad and high school at Joara Bishwamvar. From an early age, he was inspired by the works of historically remarkable singer-songwriter Askar Ali Pandit, and latterly became influenced by the Maizbhanderi Sufi Singers, such as Moulana Bazlul Karim Kanchanpuri, Moulana Abdul Hadi, and Ramesh Shil. He never formally learned how to sing or play a harmonium, but used to follow their works.

Career
At an early age, Hali achieved 1st position in the audition of Agrabad Radio Station. Since 1963, his songs have regularly been publicized on-air through radio as collected songs because he was not registered. After 7 years, he became a registered singer-lyricist-composer of East Pakistan Radio. It was Hali's profession that, into his eighties, he led his life as a professional lyricist, composer and singer. His lyrics and compositions can be categorized in socio-cultural and Sufi method, where socio-cultural songs are more than one thousand five hundred in number and of Sufi songs there are also over thousand. Though his family encouraged him to enter other professions, Hali was only interested in music. Once in 1955/56 while singing at Maizbhander Dorbar Sharif, Hali saw huge money over his harmonium, listeners have given out of love, which was his first income as an artist. That made him realize, even by singing a song, one can survive and since then he took it as his profession. His first Maizbhanderi Sufi Lyric was: "Will you play How long!/ Will you die not?/ How many has come and gone/ Were they belongs to!". He was a regular lyricist and composer for Television and Radio Channels of Bangladesh.

Documentary
The documentary Methopother Gaan was developed representing his works and thought. Film maker Shaybal Chawdhury created this 39-minute-long documentary representing Hali as an ideal rural artist. Famous contemporary singers like Sam Suntor Boisnob, Safali Gosh, Kallani Ghosh, Abdul Mannan Rana, Salim Nizami and many others re-performed his songs in that documentary.

Academy and Ode
Abdul Gafur Hali Academy was formed regarding Cultural and Social research. As well, a Lyrics and Musical notation collection of Maizbhanderi Sufi Songs; named Hali's Ode - The Tie of Melody (/Surer Bandahn) including his 100 Maizbhanderi and Mystical Lyrics/ Songs and another one named, The Root (/Shikor) including his 100 rural Folk songs was published by Abdul Gafur Hali Academy and patronized by PHP Group.

Famous works
Among more than 1,500; some of his most popular Sufi songs are:
 
 
 
 
 
 

Meanwhile, over thousand, some popular socio-cultural songs are:
 
 
 
 
 
 
 
 
 
 

During the Liberation War of Bangladesh he sang songs to inspire the fighters, such as:
It is impossible to be familiar with you and me / You are Pathan and I am Bengali / Between your country and mine / There is a distance of 2000 miles.

International acknowledgement
Professor Hans Harder of Heidelberg University, Germany visited different places in Bangladesh including Maizbhander of Chittagong in 1989 and the reason how, he met Abdul Gafur Hali through another popular singer Kolyani Ghosh. Latterly, Harder published a research work (treatise) named Ferkute Gafur; Spritht Gafur Means, Dippy gafur Says ( in 2004. It includes 76 songs of Hali. Hans Harder denoted the songs as, "Mystical songs of East Bengal (Bangladesh) composed by Abdul Gafur Hali". He narrated about Abdul Gafur Hali, "In spite of having any higher degree or designation of any University, Abdul Gafur Hali with his own effort was able to have an extraordinary knowledge".

As well, an album entitled, Foreign Beloved ( produced by Indian Music director Koustob Sen Varat, was dedicated to Abdul Gafur Hali. Producer included Hali's five songs in that music album.

Awards
He achieved a number of national and institutional awards. Some of those are:
 Rahe Bhander Ennoble Award ( - 2012
 Chittagong Association Award/ Chittagong Summit Dhaka ( - 2012 
 Bangladesh Musical Organizations' Association Award ( - 2013
 Sukhendu Memorial Theater Award ( - 2013 
 District Cultural Academy Award ( - 2013

Death
Gafur died on 21 December 2016 at Mount Hospital in Chittagong.

See also
 List of Sufi Saints of South Asia
 Sufism

External links
 Official Website of Rahe Bhander Sufi Order, Rahe Bhander Ennoble Award
 Alliance France, Alliances françaises of Chittagong and Dhaka

References

1929 births
2016 deaths
Bangladeshi composers
20th-century Bangladeshi male singers
20th-century Bangladeshi singers
Bangladeshi lyricists
Male composers
Sufism in Bangladesh